Aislaby is a village and civil parish in the Scarborough district of North Yorkshire, England. It is situated near the town of Whitby on the northern slopes of Eskdale just off the A171.

History
The village is mentioned in the Domesday Book as Asuluesbi in the Hundred of Langbaurgh. It was listed as having 2 ploughlands with 6 acres of meadow and woodland. The Lord in 1066 was named as Uhtred, but had changed to Richard of Sourdeval under the tenancy of Count Robert of Mortain. Lordship descended to the Brus family by the reign of Henry I and then Lucy de Thweng via the Rosels family and Nicholas de Meynell. By the early fourteenth century it had passed as a mense lordship to Arnald de Percy. From then on it was held by the Darcy family and the Strangways until 1541 when it became part of the holdings of Lord Dacre until 1685. 
Like its namesakes near Pickering and the other to the west of Stockton-on-Tees the place-name is derived from Viking Old Norse meaning "Aslakr's or Asulf's farm".

The area around the village is noted for its quarries, and the stone that was used in many local buildings and further afield in some notable structures such as London Bridge and Ramsgate Pier.

Governance
The village lies within the Scarborough and Whitby Parliamentary constituency; the Mulgrave War of Scarborough Borough District; and of the Whitby/Maythorpe cum Mulgrave Electoral Division of North Yorkshire County Council.

Demography
According to the 2011 UK census, Aislaby parish had a population of 243, in 164 dwellings, a reduction on the 2001 UK census figure of 280.

Community

The village lies within the catchment area of Stakesby Community Primary School in Whitby for Primary Education and of Eskdale School and Caedmon College Whitby for Secondary Education.

Religion
There is a church in the village dedicated to St Margaret built in 1897. This had replaced a 1732 building that itself had replaced the earlier medieval church. The church is Grade II listed building.

References

External links 
 

Villages in North Yorkshire
Civil parishes in North Yorkshire